Bramati is an Italian surname. Notable people with the surname include:

Davide Bramati (born 1968), Italian cyclist
Fabrizio Bramati (born 1993), Italian footballer
Luca Bramati (born 1968), Italian cyclist

Italian-language surnames